Santo Estêvão is a former civil parish in the municipality of Tavira, Portugal. In 2013, the parish merged into the new parish Luz de Tavira e Santo Estêvão.

References

Former parishes of Tavira